A deputy lieutenant of Greater London is commissioned by the Lord Lieutenant of Greater London.

Deputy lieutenants support the work of the lord-lieutenant. There can be several deputy lieutenants at any time, depending on the population of the county. Their appointment does not terminate with the changing of the lord-lieutenant, but they usually retire at age 75.

20th Century

|  style="text-align:left; width:33%; vertical-align:top;"|
23 May 1966: Sir Cyril Wilson Black
23 May 1966: Lieutenant-Colonel and Brevet Colonel Hugh Craig, 
23 May 1966: Lieutenant-Colonel and Brevet Colonel Frank Herbert Everingham, 
23 May 1966: Brigadier Sir George Steven Harvie-Watt, 
23 May 1966: Colonel (Honorary Brigadier) Harold Brian Jolly, 
23 May 1966: Honorary Lieutenant-Colonel Archer Frederick Leggett, 
23 May 1966: Colonel Sir Stuart Sidney Mallinson, 
23 May 1966: Sir James Marshall
23 May 1966: Honorary Lieutenant-Colonel Basil Monk, 
23 May 1966: Major (Honorary Lieutenant-Colonel) The Rt. Hon. The Lord Rea, 
23 May 1966: Flight Lieutenant Sydney William Leonard Ripley
4 September 1967: Sir Harold Charles Shearman
8 November 1967: Henry Carlisle Wilson Bennetts, Esq.
8 November 1967: Captain Michael David Nevil Cobbold, 
8 November 1967: The Lord Constantine of Stanmore, 
8 November 1967: Lieutenant-Colonel Penry Lowick Cooper, 
8 November 1967: Lieutenant-Colonel Hugh Llewelyn Daniel, 
8 November 1967: Flying Officer Donald Alfred James Draper, Esq., 
8 November 1967: Colonel Peter Beaumont Earle, 
8 November 1967: The Lord Fiske, 
8 November 1967: Lieutenant-Colonel and Brevet-Colonel Lewis McPherson Fordyce, 
8 November 1967: Colonel Peter Walter Foster, 
8 November 1967: Colonel Martin John Grafton, 
8 November 1967: Captain Arthur Edward Chase Green, 
8 November 1967: Lieutenant-Colonel Henry Robert Hall, 
8 November 1967: Lieutenant-Colonel Basil William Seymour Irwin, 
8 November 1967: Colonel Edward George Aldred Kynaston, 
8 November 1967: Colonel Douglas John McLelland, 
8 November 1967: Harold Trevor Mote, Esq.
8 November 1967: Lieutenant-Colonel Cyril Howard Nice, 
8 November 1967: Colonel Richard Edward Owen, 
8 November 1967: Rear Admiral Ronald Etridge Portlock, 
8 November 1967: Sir Percy Rugg
8 November 1967: Major Harold Charles Stewart, 
8 November 1967: John Barrett Turner, Esq.
8 November 1967: Major Robert Charles Watson, 
8 November 1967: Brigadier Hamilton Edward Crosdill Weldon, 
8 November 1967: Willard Charles Williams, Esq., 
8 November 1967: Colonel Basil Reginald Wood, 
22 January 1969: Admiral Sir Charles Edward Madden, 
19 May 1970: Lord Brayley, Esq., 
19 May 1970: Rear Admiral Thomas Vallack Briggs, 
19 May 1970: Rear Admiral Bryan Cecil Durant, 
19 May 1970: Arthur Desmond Herne Plummer, Esq., 
19 May 1970: Air Commodore The Hon. Sir Peter Beckford Rutgers Vanneck, 
11 November 1970: Lieutenant General Sir Geoffrey Charles Evans, 
7 February 1972: Colonel Derrick Brian Pullen, 
6 February 1973: The Rt. Hon. The Lord Boyd-Carpenter, 
6 February 1973: R. P. Cave, Esq., 
6 February 1973: Colonel Earl of Avon, 
6 February 1973: Major A. W. Higgins, 
6 February 1973: Air Commodore W. I. C. Inness, 
6 February 1973: Major-General Sir Nigel Tapp, 
6 February 1973: Colonel F. E. Wilkins, 
4 September 1973: Colonel John Alastair Dudgeon, 
4 September 1973: Colonel N. C. Oswald, 
4 September 1973: Lieutenant-Colonel J. C. T. Peddie, 
4 September 1973: Colonel G. R. A. Wixley, 
1 January 1977: Group Captain Sir Douglas Robert Steuart Bader, 
1 January 1977: Leonard Edward Rowan Bentall, Esq.
1 January 1977: Colonel Henry Leslie Clarke, 
1 January 1977: Commander David Laurence Cobb, 
1 January 1977: John Jacob Cohen, Esq.
1 January 1977: Lieutenant-Colonel George William D'Arcy, 
1 January 1977: Captain Kenneth John Douglas-Morris
1 January 1977: Leslie Freeman, Esq., 
1 January 1977: Lieutenant-Colonel and Brevet Colonel James Samuel Haywood, 
1 January 1977: Baroness Macleod of Borve
1 January 1977: Colonel Ronald Thomas Stewart Macpherson, 
1 January 1977: Brevet Colonel Hugh Edward Maltby, 
1 January 1977: Morgan Charles Garnet Man, Esq., 
1 January 1977: Major Sir Paul Henry Newall, 
1 January 1977: Colonel Alan Frank Niekirk, 
1 January 1977: Dennis Hayden Piper, Esq.
1 January 1977: Colonel James William Gordon Pine
1 January 1977, Raymond Pope, Esq.

|  style="text-align:left; width:33%; vertical-align:top;"|

1 January 1977, Gordon Ratman, Esq.
1 January 1977: Captain Barry St. George Austin Reed, 
1 January 1977: Lieutenant (Acting Colonel) Eric Anthony Ricketts
1 January 1977: Major-General James Alexander Rowland Robertson, 
1 January 1977: Rear-Admiral John Earl Scotland, 
1 January 1977, Colonel George Digby Thompson, 
1 January 1977: Lieutenant Colonel (Honorary Colonel) Peter Harold Webber, 
1 January 1977: Arthur Wicks, Esq.
12 June 1978: Lawrence Bains, 
12 June 1978: Hugh Cubitt, 
12 June 1978: C. A. Prendergast
12 June 1978: R. T. J. Stone
12 June 1978: Group Captain Leonard Edward Robins, 
12 June 1978: Captain P. S. Rees, 
12 June 1978: Sir Kirby Laing
12 June 1978: Alastair Black, 
12 June 1978: D. F. W. Ford
30 June 1978: Sir James Swaffield, 
2 January 1980: S. Kershen
2 January 1980: Lieutenant-Colonel J. H. Hanscombe, 
2 January 1980: Colonel K. J. Grace, 
2 January 1980: P. F. Corbett
2 January 1980: Commodore C. P. C. Noble, 
1 June 1981: Captain G. K. Beattie, 
1 June 1981: J. R. French
1 June 1981: W. M. Taylor
1 June 1981: Brigadier Allan John Woolford, 
1 July 1981: Major R. Berry, 
1 July 1981: Lord Bowness, 
1 July 1981: Sir Ashley Bramall
1 July 1981: Sir Horace Walter Cutler, 
1 July 1981: Alexander Neeter, Esq.
11 August 1981: General Sir Hugh Beach, 
18 January 1983: Major R. Blackford
18 January 1983: Colonel G. S. P. Carden, 
18 January 1983: Reg M. Fryer, Esq., 
18 January 1983: A. M. Goodhart, 
18 January 1983: H. Haywood, Esq., 
18 January 1983: D. Jacobs, Esq.
18 January 1983: Air Commodore John Francis Langer, 
18 January 1983: M. M. Lorek
18 January 1983: H. Shepherd, Esq.
18 January 1983: G. H. Sinclair, Esq.
18 January 1983: Major J. W. S. Telford
18 January 1983: Major J. A. Watson, 
17 April 1985: Colonel John Allan Dalrymple Anderson, 
17 April 1985: C. Ashley, Esq.
17 April 1985: Colonel R. M. Cain, 
17 April 1985: Colonel J. M. Craig, 
17 April 1985: Colonel A. E. Hall, 
17 April 1985: Lieutenant Colonel P. G. Jones, 
17 April 1985: T. S. Mallinson, Esq.
17 April 1985: P. Orchard-Lisle, Esq., 
17 April 1985: D. M. Mason, 
17 April 1985: Colonel D. C. Part, 
17 April 1985: W. N. B. Richardson, Esq.
17 April 1985: Colonel Gordon Thomas Spate, 
17 April 1985: I. Spencer, Esq.
17 April 1985: R. A. Walters
10 September 1986: Major His Honour Judge P. T. S. Batterbury, 
10 September 1986: Brigadier Peter Christopher Bowser, 
10 September 1986: R. J. L. Bramble, Esq.
10 September 1986: Niranjan Joseph De Silva Deva Aditya, Esq.
10 September 1986: B. H. Caesar-Gordon, Esq.
10 September 1986: H. Gould, Esq., 
10 September 1986: I. Harrington, Esq.
10 September 1986: J. N. Harrington, Esq.
10 September 1986: Group-Captain P. L. Harris, 
10 September 1986: Major D. N. I. Pearce, 
10 September 1986: Brigadier B. C. Ridley
10 September 1986: Colonel Sir Greville Douglas Spratt, 
10 September 1986: S. M. Springer, Esq., 
10 September 1986: M. F. Stonefrost, Esq., 
10 September 1986: Major General Michael John Hatley Walsh, 
10 September 1986: D. E. E. Wood, Esq.

|  style="text-align:left; width:33%; vertical-align:top;"|

5 January 1987: Sir Frederick Howard Michael Craig-Cooper, 
5 January 1987: Sir Alan David Greengross
1 July 1987: The Lord Rix, 
1 July 1987: Major Edwina Olwyn Coven, 
1 March 1988: John Hayter
1 March 1988: The Viscount Monckton of Brenchley
1 March 1988: The Lord Newall
1 March 1988: Dorothy Reynolds
1 March 1988: Colonel The Viscount Slim, 
1 March 1988: John Thomas Watford, 
21 April 1988: Sir Godfrey Taylor
13 May 1988: Lieutenant Colonel Michael Fox Low, 
13 May 1988: Colonel Peter Ernest Williams, 
28 June 1988: The Lord Pitt of Hampstead
28 June 1988: Lady Shirley Porter
13 October 1988: Professor Christopher Anthony Prendergast, 
24 April 1989: Richard Maddox Brew, Esq., 
24 April 1989: Sir Rodney George Brooke, 
24 April 1989: John Bull, Esq.
24 April 1989: Nicholas Hall Freeman, 
24 April 1989: David Miles, Esq.
2 February 1990: The Rt. Hon. Sir Frederic Mackarness Bennett
2 February 1990: Ernest Frederick Dunckley
2 February 1990: The Lady Williams of Elvel
5 June 1990: Anthony Francis William Powell
13 May 1991: Joan Wheeler-Bennet
1 July 1991: John Reid
16 September 1991: Peter Geoffrey Nathan, 
10 October 1991: Sir John Dellow, 
29 November 1991: Lieutenant Colonel Conrad Graham, 
12 February 1992: John Louis Brunei Cohen, 
12 February 1992: Derek Risien Fenton, 
12 February 1992: Surgeon Captain Malcolm Neville Naylor, 
15 April 1992: Lieutenant Colonel Paul Edgar Piggott
12 January 1993: Commodore Antony Dennis Barrett, 
12 January 1993: Colonel Neil Anthony Johnson, 
12 January 1993: Colonel Stephen Anthony Sellon, 
7 April 1993: Colonel Brian Andrew Kay, 
6 May 1993: Colonel John Holland
26 November 1993: Colonel Michael John Dudding, 
2 June 1994: Air Vice-Marshal David Richard Hawkins, 
2 June 1994: Chief Constable The Lord Imbert, 
2 June 1994: Lucille Nemeth
2 June 1994: Lieutenant Colonel Robert John Redford
2 June 1994: Colonel P. R. H. Thompson, 
26 October 1994: Commander J. McK. Ludgate, 
26 October 1994: Colonel Ian William Bernard McRobbie, 
26 October 1994: Colonel C. H. Martin, 
21 March 1995: Air Commodore B. B. Batt
21 March 1995: Patrick J. O'Brien Esquire, 
31 May 1995: George Bodin, Esq.
21 June 1995: Brigadier A. K. Crawford, 
21 June 1995: Angela Hooper, 
30 January 1996: Anthony Charles Everett, Esq., 
30 January 1996: John Trotter, Esq.
19 June 1996: Brigadier P. E. Woolley, 
12 September 1996: Colonel Stephen Peter Foakes, 
15 October 1996: The Earl Cadogan, 
15 October 1996: Brigadier Christopher James Marchant Smith, 
7 April 1997: Major Barnaby Cockcroft
7 April 1997: Air Vice-Marshal Clive Evans
7 April 1997: Colonel Geoffrey Godbold, 
26 September 1997: Major-General Peter Walter Ernest Istead, 
15 October 1997: Major Charles Jeffrey Winstanley, 
6 January 1998: Lieutenant Colonel Roderick Edmund Forbes Morriss, 
6 January 1998: Jenny Bianco
14 September 1998: Major Rosemary Grace Warne, 
29 September 1998: Colonel Cyril John Young, 
12 November 1998: Dame Prudence Margaret Leith, 
9 July 1999: Leonard Edward Bentall, Esq.
9 July 1999: Dr. Charles Goodson-Wickes
9 July 1999: Robert Nicholas Philipson-Stow, Esq.
9 July 1999: Anthony James Speed, Esq., 
9 July 1999: Major-General Timothy Patrick Toyne Sewell
9 July 1999: Paula Ann Nugent Vokes,

21st Century

|  style="text-align:left; width:33%; vertical-align:top;"|
14 January 2000: Major David Hewer, 
4 August 2000: George Gordon-Smith, 
19 September 2000: Bozena Laskiewicz
16 May 2001: The Lord Lingfield, 
16 May 2001: Michael Brahams
16 May 2001: Major Kevin Traverse Healy
16 May 2001: Richard Walker-Arnott, Esq.
24 September 2001: Malcolm Peter Speight Barton, Esq.
24 September 2001: The Lord Bilimoria, 
24 September 2001: Paul Cautley, 
24 September 2001: Colonel Peter Charles Cook
24 September 2001: Lieutenant Colonel Robert W. Murfin, 
24 September 2001: Lieutenant Colonel Robert Barry Paddison, 
24 September 2001: The Lord Stevens of Kirkwhelpington, 
24 September 2001: Clare Whelan, 
5 June 2002: Andrew Henry Scott, Esq.
9 December 2002: Captain Robert Graeme Avis, 
9 December 2002: Adrian Francis Patrick Barnes, 
9 December 2002: Wing Commander Edna Felicity Partridge, 
9 December 2002: Colonel Piers Atherley David Storie-Pugh, 
19 December 2003: Admiral The Lord Boyce, 
19 December 2003: Brigadier Anthony Peter Verey, 
17 May 2004: Major Antony Richard O’Hagan, 
1 March 2005: Sir Christopher John Benson, 
31 May 2006: Robert Jonathan Davis, 
31 May 2006: Commissioner Sir Kenneth John Knight, 
31 May 2006: General Sir Jeremy John George Mackenzie, 
31 May 2006: Mei Sim Lei, 
31 May 2006: Martin Henry Charles Russell
24 October 2006: Graham Eustance, 
24 October 2006: Robert Leader
24 October 2006: Sir Trevor McDonald, 
6 February 2007: Major Jeremy Fern, 
6 February 2007: John Purnell, 
26 April 2007: The Lord Hameed, 
15 November 2007: Wing Commander Michael Greville Dudgeon, 
15 November 2007: Chief Constable Sir William Ian Ridley Johnston, 
15 November 2007: Dr. Paul Anthony Knapman
15 November 2007: General The Lord Walker of Aldringham, 
28 July 2008: Colonel Jane Davis, 
10 December 2008: John Barber, Esq.
10 December 2008: Baroness Benjamin, 
10 December 2008: Simon Duckworth
10 December 2008: Colonel Hugh Purcell, 
10 December 2008: Cyrus Todiwala, 
6 July 2009: Katharine Brock, 
6 July 2009: Rosemary Jill Prescott
21 December 2009: Colonel Paul Willum Acda, 
21 December 2009: Colonel Markham Patrick Bryant

|  style="text-align:left; width:33%; vertical-align:top;"|

21 December 2009: David Alan Ezra Dangoor, 
21 December 2009: Sir Paul Joseph Patrick Grant
21 December 2009: Bruce Fiddes Houlder, 
21 December 2009: Paul Malcolm Kennerley, 
21 December 2009: Kathryn Alexandra McDowell, 
21 December 2009: The Reverend Nims Obunge, 
5 May 2010: Colonel Ewen Gordon Cameron, 
30 June 2010: General The Lord Dannatt, 
5 November 2010: Sandra Diane Cahill
31 March 2011: Lady Elizabeth Arnold
31 March 2011: Ian Edward Barlow, Esq.
31 March 2011: Lieutenant Colonel Nicholas John Pierce Brunt
31 March 2011: Major Christopher Harold Alexander Goodwin, 
31 March 2011: Maureen Gordon
31 March 2011: Major General Sir Iain Charles Mackay-Dick, 
31 March 2011: Anton Mosimann, 
31 March 2011: Maria Famlayo Pedro
31 March 2011: The Reverend Canon Flora Jane Louise Winfield
31 March 2011: Roxane Zand
9 October 2012: Barry George Albin-Dyer, 
9 October 2012: Major General Alastair Bruce of Crionaich, 
9 October 2012: The Hon. Edward Charles Cadogan, Viscount Chelsea
9 October 2012: Rupert Andrew Woodward Goodman
9 October 2012: Nitesh Gor, 
9 October 2012: Pieter van der Merwe, 
9 October 2012: Major John Francis Meadows Rodwell
26 April 2014: Captain Peter Alan Baker, 
26 April 2014: Ann Elizabeth Cable, 
26 April 2014: Richard Kornicki, Esq., 
26 April 2014: Nusrat Mehboob Lilani, 
26 April 2014: Leslie Morgan, 
26 April 2014: The Reverend Canon David Reindorp, 
22 May 2014: Thomas Chan, Esq.
6 March 2015: Bruce Carnegie-Brown
6 March 2015: Colleen Lorraine Harris, 
6 March 2015: David Christopher Fraser Jones
6 March 2015: Vice Admiral Sir Adrian James Johns, 
6 March 2015: Dr. Mary-Clare Parker
6 March 2015: Professor David Andrew Phoenix, 
30 April 2015: Kevin David McGrath, 
9 March 2016: Dr Tariq Abbasi, 
9 March 2016: Dr Mustafa Abu-Lisan
9 March 2016: Sir William Atkinson
9 March 2016: Commander John Herriman
9 March 2016: Michael Messinger, 
9 March 2016: Bushra Nasir, 
9 March 2016: Dame Catherine Fiona Woolf, 
21 July 2016: Dr. Muhammad Abdul Bari, 

|  style="text-align:left; width:33%; vertical-align:top;"|

21 July 2016: Michael Thomas Brace, 
21 July 2016: Dr. David Haylett Easton
21 July 2016: Dr. Sheila Jeanne Gewolb
21 July 2016: Gillian Collins Norton
21 July 2016: Justin James Packshaw, 
21 July 2016: Babulal Sethia
4 September 2017: Sir Michael Dixon, 
4 September 2017: Stephen Howlett, 
4 September 2017: Avril McIntyre, 
4 September 2017: Christopher Muttukumaru, 
4 September 2017: Ian Pittaway
28 November 2017: The Reverend Martin Hislop
28 November 2017: General The Rt. Hon. The Lord Houghton of Richmond, 
28 November 2017: Chief Superintendent Simon Ovens
13 June 2018: Sir Steve Bullock
13 June 2018: Christopher Cotton
13 June 2018: Colonel Raymond Wilkinson, 
8 January 2019: Nicholas Bracken, 
8 January 2019: The Reverend Lesley Goldsmith
8 January 2019: Martin Griffiths, 
8 January 2019: Surgeon Commodore Robin McNeill Love, 
8 January 2019: Air Vice-Marshal Ranald Torquil Ian Munro, 
18 June 2019: General Sir Sir Adrian John Bradshaw, 
18 June 2019: Kim Bromley-Derry, 
18 June 2019: Patrick Edwards
18 June 2019: Major David Kemmis Betty, 
18 June 2019: Professor Paul Palmer
18 June 2019: Stuart James Shilson, 
18 June 2019: Professor Geoffrey Thompson, 
18 June 2019: Sandra Wagg
15 February 2022: Elizabeth Balgobin
15 February 2022: Dr. Rej Bhumbra
15 February 2022: Lynn Cooper
15 February 2022: Anthony Griffiths
15 February 2022: Craig Haslam
15 February 2022: Paul Herbage, 
15 February 2022: Louise Ireland
15 February 2022: Bibi Khan, 
15 February 2022: Alderman Alastair King
15 February 2022: Randeep Lall
15 February 2022: Simon Murrells
15 February 2022: Gareth Elwin Neame, 
15 February 2022: Major General Marc Overton, 
15 February 2022: Andrew Ranson, 
15 February 2022: Manjit Singh
15 February 2022: Thelma Stober
15 February 2022: Dr. Yvonne Thompson, 
15 February 2022: Christopher Wellbelove
11 October 2022: Brigadier Patrick Davidson-Houston, 
11 October 2022: Pablo Blackwood
11 October 2022: Matthew Burrow
11 October 2022: Ian Dyson, 
11 October 2022: Himanshu Jain
11 October 2022: Manju Malhi, 
11 October 2022: Geraldine Norris
11 October 2022: David Utting
11 October 2022: Major Richard Wilson, 
11 October 2022: Patricia Windsor, 
11 October 2022: YolanDa Brown

References